What the Dog Saw: And Other Adventures is the fourth book released by author Malcolm Gladwell, on October 20, 2009. The book is a compilation of the journalist's articles published in The New Yorker.

Background
Gladwell initially covered business and science in The Washington Post before joining the staff at The New Yorker in 1997. Each of the articles first appeared in The New Yorker and was handpicked by Gladwell. The stories share a common theme, namely that Gladwell tries to show us the world through the eyes of others, even if that other happens to be a dog, hence the title.

Synopsis
What the Dog Saw is a compilation of 19 articles by Malcolm Gladwell that were originally published in The New Yorker which are categorized into three parts. The first part, Obsessives, Pioneers, and other varieties of Minor Genius, describes people who are very good at what they do, but are not necessarily well-known. Part two, Theories, Predictions, and Diagnoses, describes the problems of prediction. This section covers problems such as intelligence failure, and the fall of Enron. The third section, Personality, Character, and Intelligence, discusses a wide variety of psychological and sociological topics ranging from the difference between early and late bloomers to criminal profiling.

Reception
What the Dog Saw was met with mainly positive reviews. It received profiles in many high-profile publications, including the New York Times, The Guardian, Time Magazine, The Los Angeles Times and The Independent. In particular, Gladwell was praised for his writing and storytelling, and reviewers looked upon the essay format positively, with The Guardian stating "one virtue of What the Dog Saw is that the pieces are perfectly crafted: they achieve their purpose more effectively when they aren't stretched out." What The Dog Saw was criticized for its use of statistics and its lack of technical grounding.

What the Dog Saw debuted at #3 on the New York Times Bestseller List. It spent three weeks in the top 3 and a total of 16 weeks on the chart, appearing concurrently with Gladwell's previous book Outliers. It was also an Amazon Top 25 seller for the month of November. What the Dog Saw was named to Bloomberg's top 50 business books of 2009.

References

External links
All of the articles in What the Dog Saw can be read for free on Gladwell's website.

Part 1: Obsessives, Pioneers, and other varieties of Minor Genius
The Pitchman – Ron Popeil and the Conquest of the American Kitchen
The Ketchup Conundrum – Mustard Now Comes in Dozens of Varieties.  Why Has Ketchup Stayed the Same?
Blowing Up – How Nassim Taleb Turned the Inevitability of Disaster into an Investment Strategy
True Colors – Hair Dye and the Hidden History of Post War America
John Rock's Error – What the Inventor of the Birth Control Pill Didn't Know About Women's Health
What the Dog Saw  – Cesar Millan and the Movements of Mastery

Part 2: Theories, Predictions, and Diagnoses
Open Secrets – Enron, Intelligence, and the Perils of Too Much Information
Million-Dollar Murray – Why Problems like Homelessness May Be Easier to Solve Than to Manage
The Picture Problem – Mammography, Air Power, and the Limits of Looking
Something Borrowed – Should a Charge of Plagiarism Ruin Your Life?
Connecting the Dots –  The Paradoxes of Intelligence Reform
The Art of Failure –  Why Some People Choke and Others Panic
Blowup – Who Can Be Blamed for a Disaster like the Challenger Explosion? No One, and We'd Better Get Used to It

Part 3: Personality, Character, and Intelligence
Late Bloomers – Why Do We Equate Genius with Precocity
Most Likely to Succeed – How Do We Hire When We Can't Tell Who's Right for the Job?
Dangerous Minds – Criminal Profiling Made Easy
The Talent Myth – Are Smart People Overrated?
The New-Boy Network – What Do Job Interviews Really Tell Us?
Troublemakers – What Pit Bulls Can Teach Us About Crime

2009 non-fiction books
Works originally published in The New Yorker
Works by Malcolm Gladwell
Little, Brown and Company books
Popular science books